Halo of Flies was an American noise rock band from Minneapolis. Named after an Alice Cooper song, Halo of Flies was formed in 1986 by Tom Hazelmyer, John Anglim and Tim Mac. Over the next five years they released a series of seven inch singles and mini LPs starting with a limited edition, hand numbered single called “Rubber Room”. These singles were released on Hazelmyer’s label Amphetamine Reptile Records and later compiled on a number of LPs, and eventually as the CD (Music for Insect Minds) in 1991. The band partially reformed in 2007 under the name H•O•F, and continued to release new material.

Life of band
Sales of Halo of Flies records was assisted by a manufacturing/distribution deal with the popular Minnesota label Twin Tone records. Influenced by early punk bands MC5 and The Stooges, the band had a loud raw sound that was heavily guitar influenced garage rock. Halo of Flies stopped recording in the early 1990s but Hazelmyer kept Amphetamine Reptile Records in business for 20 years by releasing music by Boss Hog, Helmet, The Melvins, Cows, God Bullies, Helios Creed and Unsane.

Discography

As Halo of Flies
Rubber Room 7-inch, 1986
Snapping Black Roscoe Bottles 7-inch, 1986
Circling the Pile 7-inch, 1987
Richies Dog 7-inch, 1987
Four from the Bottom cassette, 1988
Garbage Rock! 12-inch, 1988
Garbageburn 12-inch, 1988
No Time 7-inch, 1988
Death of a Fly 7-inch, 1989
Singles Going Nowhere 12-inch, 1989
Winged 7-inch, 1990
Big Mod Hate Trip 7-inch, 1991
Mod Showdown! 7-inch, 1991
Music For Insect Minds, 1991 (compilation of all the previously released material)

As H•O•F
split 7-inch with Wild Billy Childish and the Musicians of the British Empire, 2007
A New Kind of Hate 7-inch, 2008
When I'm Loaded 7-inch (with Lydia Lunch), 2008
F.T.W. EP, 2008
Gay Witch Abortion Sessions CD, 2009
Resurrect a Bad Idea LP, 2010

References

External links
City Pages
Minnesota Daily
2013 Audio Interview with Thomas Hazelmyer

American noise rock music groups
Amphetamine Reptile Records artists
Musical groups established in 1986
1986 establishments in Minnesota